The Melbourne 3 Day Event is an equestrian event which comprises dressage, cross-country and show-jumping. It was first run in 1957, making it Australia's oldest horse trial and the second oldest in the world.  The only older Event is Badminton in England.  The Event was established shortly after the first Australian competed at the Melbourne Olympics as a proving ground for horses and riders to prepare for future Olympics.

The M3DE has also been a qualifier for the FEI World Cup Eventing since 2003.  This class (the CIC-W***) offers Australian riders the opportunity to compete in the FEI World Cup, held annually in different locations around the world.

Venue

In recent years, the Event has been held at Werribee Park National Equestrian Centre in Werribee, a western suburb of Melbourne.  The venue is adjacent to Werribee Park, which includes the Werribee Mansion and the State Rose Garden.  On Cross Country Day, the horses and riders wind their way through the Mansion Grounds and State Rose Garden, making M3DE one if the most picturesque spectacles in the world.

Werribee is one of 3 venues that the Event has run at over the years.

Previous winners

Open - Advanced - CCI***

CIC-W***

References

Eventing
Equestrian sports competitions in Australia
Sports competitions in Melbourne